Shanice Antonette Banton (born 1992) is a Canadian actress known for her role as Marisol Lewis on Degrassi: The Next Generation. She has also portrayed Violet Hart on Murdoch Mysteries since season eleven. Her first appearance in a feature film was playing Ruth, the wife of Jesse Owens in the 2016 film Race.

Personal life 
Banton is the daughter of Jamaican immigrant parents, the fifth of six children. She trained as a drama and musical theatre student at Wexford Collegiate School for the Arts. She lives in Toronto.

Filmography

Television

Film

References

External links
 

1992 births
Canadian television actresses
Canadian child actresses
Living people
Canadian people of Jamaican descent
Actresses from Toronto